Philip John Hesketh   (born 15 November 1964) is a British Anglican priest. Since June 2016, he has served as the Dean of Rochester, the head of the chapter of Rochester Cathedral and the most senior priest in the Diocese of Rochester.

Early life and education
Hesketh was born on 15 November 1964 in Southport, Lancashire, England. He was brought up on the Isle of Man, and educated at St Ninian's High School, Douglas. In 1983, he moved to London and matriculated into King's College London to study divinity. He graduated in 1986 with a Bachelor of Divinity (BD) degree and the Associateship of King's College (AKC) qualification. In 1992, he entered Ripon College Cuddesdon, an Anglican theological college, to train for ordained ministry. During this time he also undertook postgraduate research at his old college, and graduated with a Doctor of Philosophy (PhD) degree from King's College, London in 1984.

Ordained ministry
Hesketh was ordained in the Church of England as a deacon in 1994 and as a priest in 1995. From 1994 to 1998, he served his curacy at Holy Cross Church, Bearsted in the Diocese of Canterbury. Then, from 1998 to 2005, he was Vicar of St Stephen's Church, Chatham in the Diocese of Rochester.

In 2005, Hesketh was appointed a canon residentiary of Rochester Cathedral. When Mark Beach resigned as dean in January 2015, Hesketh was appointed acting-dean. On 26 February 2016, it was announced that he would be the next Dean of Rochester. He was installed as dean at Rochester Cathedral during a service on 19 June 2016.

Personal life
In 1989, Hesketh is married Sugina Hesketh, a medical doctor; together they have four children.

He was appointed a Deputy Lieutenant of Kent in 2019.

References

1964 births
Living people
Alumni of King's College London
Associates of King's College London
Alumni of Ripon College Cuddesdon
20th-century English Anglican priests
21st-century English Anglican priests
Deans of Rochester
Deputy Lieutenants of Kent
Manx Anglican priests